NGC 3293 is an open cluster in the Carina constellation. It was discovered by Nicolas-Louis de Lacaille in 1751.
It consists of more than 100 stars brighter than 14th magnitude in a 10 arc minute field, the brightest of which are blue supergiants of apparent magnitude 6.5 and 6.7.  There is also a 7th magnitude pulsating red supergiant, V361 Carinae.

NGC 3293 is associated with the open cluster NGC 3324. Both are fairly young, at around 12 million years old. They show some degree of mass segregation, with more massive stars concentrated near their centers. Neither are dynamically relaxed.

References

External links
 
 NGC 3293 @ SEDS NGC objects pages 
 
 

Carina Nebula
NGC 3293
3293
Carina (constellation)
3293